Jung Joon-won may refer to:
 Jung Joon-won (actor, born 1988), South Korean actor
 Jung Joon-won (actor, born 2004), South Korean actor